The women's welterweight (67 kilograms) event at the 2014 Asian Games took place on 2 October 2014 at Ganghwa Dolmens Gymnasium, Incheon, South Korea.

A total of thirteen competitors from thirteen different countries competed in this event, limited to fighters whose body weight was less than 67 kilograms.

Guo Yunfei of China defended her 2010 title and won the gold medal after beating Lee Won-jin of South Korea in the gold medal match by the score of 2–1.

The bronze medal was shared by Liu Qing of Macau and Hà Thị Nguyên from Vietnam. Liu Qing won Macau's first ever taekwondo medal at the Asian Games.

Schedule
All times are Korea Standard Time (UTC+09:00)

Results

References

External links
Official website

Taekwondo at the 2014 Asian Games